Caseware International Inc. (CWI), formerly stylized as CaseWare, is a company that sells software for accounting, auditing, financial, risk and governance professionals. It's software is used in 130 countries and available in 16 languages.

History

 In 1988, CWI was founded in Toronto by Dwight Wainman, Joey Caturay.

 In 1989, CWI released the first version of Caseware Working Papers for the North American market.
 In 1991, CWI added Caseware Time to its product line.
 In 1992, CWI began to establish a global distributor network starting with the European market.
 In 2000, CWI acquired all rights to IDEA (Interactive Data Extraction and Analysis), from the Canadian Institute of Chartered Accountants (CICA). CWI then formed Caseware IDEA Inc., to continue to develop and market IDEA globally.
 In 2004, Caseware IDEA acquired key European distributor Audicon B.V., and renamed the company Caseware IDEA B.V. with sales offices in Netherlands, Belgium and France.
 In 2005, CWI opened offices in Hong Kong and Beijing to service China and the rest of Asia.
 In 2006, CWI opened its Latin American headquarters in Costa Rica.
 In 2008, CWI opened its European headquarters in Amsterdam.
 In 2010, CWI acquired all outstanding shares of UK distributor Credence Software Ltd. renaming the company Caseware UK.
 In 2010, Caseware IDEA acquired SymSure Limited, a continuous monitoring and continuous auditing software company.
 In 2019, Caseware RCM rebranded its continuous controls monitoring and anti-money laundering (AML) solution as Alessa
 In 2022, CWI opened its South America headquarters in Colombia.

See also
 CAATTS
 XBRL
 Continuous monitoring
 Continuous Auditing
 International Financial Reporting Standards (IFRS)
 Generally Accepted Accounting Principles (GAAP)
 International Auditing and Assurance Standards Board (IAASB)

References

External links

Waterloo professor wins CA profession innovation leadership award
CaseWare Trademark Dispute with the SEC over IDEA Trademark
Partnership with the Institute of Internal Auditors
Ottawa Business Journal feature on CaseWare RCM Inc.

Software companies of Canada
Companies based in Toronto